Ajharail railway station is a halt railway station on Katihar–Siliguri branch of Howrah–New Jalpaiguri line in the Katihar railway division of Northeast Frontier Railway zone. It is situated beside National Highway 34, Bagdob of Katihar district in the Indian state of Bihar. Total 8 passengers train stop at Ajharail railway station.

References

Railway stations in Katihar district
Katihar railway division